Designing Women, also known as House of Cards, is a 1934 British drama film directed by Ivar Campbell and starring Stewart Rome, Valerie Taylor and Tyrell Davis. It was shot at Shepperton Studios.

Cast
Stewart Rome as Travers
Valerie Taylor as Diana Dent
Tyrell Davis as Hildebrand Way
D. A. Clarke-Smith as Bowsfield
Cyril Gardiner as Alan Dent 
Kathleen Kelly as Molly
Edgar Driver as Green

References

Bibliography
 Low, Rachael. Filmmaking in 1930s Britain. George Allen & Unwin, 1985.
 Wood, Linda. British Films, 1927-1939. British Film Institute, 1986.

External links

1934 films
Films directed by Ivar Campbell
Films shot at Shepperton Studios
Metro-Goldwyn-Mayer films
British black-and-white films
British drama films
1934 drama films
1930s British films
1930s English-language films